Oscar Jorge Luis Retamal Enríquez (born 23 March 1998) is an Argentine professional footballer who plays as a forward for Club Sapere.

Career
Retamal came through the ranks at Primera División clubs River Plate, Newell's Old Boys and Rosario Central. Diego Cocca promoted him into the latter's first-team in April 2019 ahead of a Copa de la Superliga first round, second leg tie against Aldosivi; who held a two-goal lead. Retamal came off the bench with ten minutes remaining in place of Maximiliano Lovera, as the club went on to win the match but were eliminated on aggregate. He was released in the succeeding June. Retamal subsequently joined Liga Neuquén outfit Club Sapere, though the forward expressed a wish to play abroad in 2020. He scored on debut for Sapere.

Career statistics
.

References

External links

1998 births
Living people
People from Neuquén
Argentine footballers
Association football forwards
Rosario Central footballers